Transforming growth factor beta regulator 1 is a protein that in humans is encoded by the TBRG1 gene.

References

Further reading